Christopher Dylan Judd (born 8 September 1983) is a former professional Australian rules footballer and captain of both the West Coast Eagles and Carlton Football Club in the Australian Football League (AFL).

Widely regarded as one of the best footballers in the modern game, Judd twice won the league's highest individual honour, the Brownlow Medal, and was a dual Leigh Matthews Trophy winner as the AFL Players Association most valuable player. He was also a premiership captain, having captained the West Coast Eagles to the 2006 AFL Premiership. Consistently recognised as one of the game's premier midfielders, Judd was selected in the All-Australian team six times, including as captain in 2008. At a representative level, he played for Australia in the 2002 International Rules Series and for Victoria in the AFL Hall of Fame Tribute Match in 2008.

Judd is recognised as a great at two clubs: West Coast and Carlton. During his 134 games with West Coast, he captained the club for two seasons and won two Club Champion Awards. After returning to Melbourne to captain the Carlton Football Club, Judd won the John Nicholls Medal as the club's Best and Fairest three times, and became the fourth player in AFL history to win a Brownlow Medal at more than one club. In August 2021 Judd was elevated into the AFL Hall of Fame.

Early life
Judd was born in Melbourne to Andrew Judd and Lisa Engel. He was raised in Melbourne's south-eastern suburbs, where he played for the East Sandringham Junior Football Club before he attended Caulfield Grammar School. Judd was an all-round sportsman and junior track and field star and solid cricket player. At Caulfield Grammar, he began to focus on Australian rules football and later captained the school's First team. Judd attained an ENTER score of 96.20 on his Victorian Certificate of Education. He attended St Leonard's College (Melbourne) throughout his primary school years.

Judd was a graduate of the 2000 AIS/AFL Academy and participated in the 2000 AFL Under 18 Championships, although due to his young age at 17, he was too young to be drafted by an AFL club. He played TAC Cup football with the Sandringham Dragons through to 2001.

At the 2001 AFL Under 18 Championships, Judd was named captain of the Vic Metro team, despite chronic shoulder problems. Although he missed the 2001 AFL Draft Camp, his performances at the state championships made him an obvious standout to recruiters and he was tipped to be picked high in the 2001 AFL Draft. Judd was taken by West Coast with its priority draft pick (No. 3 overall) in what was later to be called the "super draft" due to the standout quality of the players to have developed from that draft year.

AFL career

West Coast Eagles career (2002–2007)
Judd played only one WAFL match before making his debut for West Coast in round 2, 2002. He had an impressive debut season, winning the AFLPA Best First Year Player Award. In his second season, he alternated between the midfield and forward line and with several dominant performances he finished runner up in the club's best and fairest. He was appointed as one of the Eagles' four vice-captains prior to the commencement of the 2004 season.

Breakthrough season, Brownlow Medal and grand final loss (2004–2005)
2004 was Judd's breakthrough season in which he combined with captain Ben Cousins, midfielder Daniel Kerr and ruckman Dean Cox in the Eagles' midfield. Judd averaged 22 disposals, kicked 24 goals for the season, and became West Coast's first Brownlow medallist, polling 30 votes to finish seven ahead of runner-up Mark Ricciuto. Additionally, he was named to his first All-Australian team as a wingman, and won the Eagles' Club Champion award for the first time.

Captain and grand final win (2006–2007)

On 1 March 2006, Judd was named captain of the club, succeeding Ben Cousins who stepped down from the role for disciplinary reasons. He led the Eagles to a one-point victory against Sydney in the 2006 AFL Grand Final, winning his only AFL Premiership medallion. Additionally, he won his second club best and fairest award, his second All-Australian selection and the Leigh Matthews Trophy as the AFL Players Association's Most Valuable Player.

Judd's strong form continued into 2007 and he polled Brownlow votes in each of his first eight games for the season. However, as the year progressed, he was hampered by a chronic groin injury which sidelined him for several weeks and restricted his performance in the games he played. He was forced to play-off the bench and in the forward line often and was rested for several games in anticipation of playing in the finals series. He had won one premiership and was runner-up with the West Coast Eagles in 2005.

Leaving West Coast (2007)
On 16 September 2007, two days after West Coast's semi-final elimination by Collingwood, it was announced that Judd had left West Coast and would be requesting a trade to a club in Victoria. He notified West Coast coach John Worsfold and CEO Trevor Nisbett of his intentions earlier that day. As arguably the most talented player in the competition, his departure created much attention and speculation among the Melbourne-based clubs, the media and the football community.

In the weeks following the announcement of his departure, Judd met with four clubs: Essendon, Melbourne, Collingwood and Carlton. On 2 October 2007, Judd announced that his preferred club was Carlton, and Carlton was also considered most likely to secure a trade with West Coast, because the club held two early draft picks which could be used in negotiations. On 11 October 2007, Judd was officially traded to Carlton along with a third round selection in the 2007 AFL Draft (No. 46 overall) for Carlton's first and second round selections (No. 3 and 20) and Josh Kennedy, who was reluctant to leave Carlton. Judd was subsequently given the No. 5 guernsey vacated by the trade of Kennedy, and he signed a six-year, $6,000,000 contract with the club.

Carlton career (2008–2015)

Captain and second Brownlow Medal (2008–2010)
During the off-season, Judd was awarded the captaincy of the club entering into his first season with the Blues. His first game in navy blue was a Friday afternoon practice match on 7 March 2008 against the Western Bulldogs at MC Labour Park, with his presence attracting 12,000 fans, and he began his senior career with the club in the first round. His return match against West Coast at Subiaco Oval in round 7 was widely anticipated in the media, and Carlton won by 37 points. Judd played 21 of the 22 home-and-away games through the season was named All-Australian captain and ruck rover – his third All-Australian selection, and first as captain – and won the John Nicholls Medal for the best and fairest of the Carlton Football Club. He also represented the Victorian team the following week for the Hall of Fame Tribute Match. Judd again won the John Nicholls Medal and All-Australian selection in 2009.

Judd had a controversial end to his 2009 season. In Carlton's elimination final loss to Brisbane, Judd was cited by the Match Review Panel for misconduct against Michael Rischitelli, after Judd made unnecessary contact near Rischitelli's eyes. The media initially reported the case as eye-gouging, and Judd created a bigger controversy when he stated that his intention was not to eye-gouge, but to push a pressure point behind Rischitelli's ear. Judd later said that his comment was intended as dry humor, but it was misinterpreted as genuine and prompted condemnation from many sources, from sports commentators to martial arts experts. After contesting the charge and appealing the penalty at the AFL Tribunal, Judd was suspended for three weeks. In another deadpan statement after the hearing, he stated "I've since watched a couple of Steven Seagal movies and realised that pressure points are no laughing matter," but he also acknowledged his own "stupidity" in the controversy. Then, his leadership was called into question when the team misbehaved during an organised Christmas booze cruise, which saw suspensions to teammates Andrew Walker, Eddie Betts and Ryan Houlihan.

After missing the opening three rounds of the 2010 season due to the "pressure point" incident, Judd earned three Brownlow votes in each of his first five matches for the season, going on to win his second Brownlow Medal with 30 votes, four ahead of 2009 Brownlow Medallist Gary Ablett, Jr. He became the thirteenth VFL/AFL player to win the Brownlow more than once, the fourth VFL/AFL player to win the Brownlow at two different clubs (West Coast and Carlton), and the first VFL/AFL player to twice poll thirty or more votes in a season. Judd also won his fifth All-Australian selection, being named on the interchange bench, and his third consecutive John Nicholls Medal, becoming the only player other than Nicholls to win the Carlton best and fairest award three times in a row.

Return to finals and further awards (2011–2012)
In 2011, Judd led Carlton to its best season in a decade, helping the team finish 5th at the end of the season, and to record its first finals victory since 2001. He was awarded the Leigh Matthews Trophy for the second time in his career, as well as the AFLPA's Best Captain Award for the first time. He was named vice-captain and ruck-rover of the All-Australian team, his fourth consecutive selection. He had entered the Brownlow Medal count as an unbackable favourite, with Sportsbet electing to pay out early after round 20, but he ultimately finished fifth. He played his 200th AFL game during the season.

Final years
In 2012, Judd played his 100th match for Carlton as captain against Hawthorn in round 14. In round 16 against  he was reported for misconduct in that he pulled opposition player Leigh Adams' arm up, causing the shoulder to dislocate, in a move known as a "chicken wing tackle". Judd denied that he intended to hurt Adams, but the tribunal found him guilty and suspended him for four matches. He finished third in the John Nicholls Medal for the 2012 season.

Following the 2012 season, Judd took on a smaller role in the team, electing to relinquish the captaincy and step down from the leadership group. After his original six-year contract ended at the end of 2013, he began signing single-year contracts in preparation for the end of his career. In round 10, 2015, he suffered an anterior cruciate ligament injury in his left knee and subsequently announced his retirement days later, bringing an end to his 279-game career.

Playing style
At his peak, Judd was the best midfielder in the game and is widely regarded as one of the best players of the 2000s decade. The strengths and traits of Judd's playing style were different between his time at West Coast and his time at Carlton, and he has been widely lauded for his proficiency at both. At West Coast, while he was a strong ball-winner, it was as an outside midfielder and ball-user where he distinguished himself. He possessed a combination of explosive speed, acceleration, agility and core strength which few if any players in the league could match; these attributes gave him the ability to receive the ball in traffic, then break free from or weave around taggers and opponents, allowing him to take clearing kicks in open space which were damaging to opposition teams. By the time he had joined Carlton, he had lost much of his acceleration and agility owing to the groin injuries he suffered in 2007. He overcame this by converting his game style to predominantly inside ball-winning role. By virtue of his core strength and balance, he became one of the best in the league at receiving ruck tap-outs, and riding or shaking off tackles in packs and congestion to win clearing handpasses to Carlton's outside midfielders.

Footballing recognition
Judd has been praised by AFL journalists and past players in addition to formal awards he has received.

Statistics

|- style="background-color: #EAEAEA"
! scope="row" style="text-align:center" | 2002
|style="text-align:center;"|
| 3 || 22 || 21 || 12 || 222 || 109 || 331 || 48 || 63 || 1.0 || 0.5 || 10.1 || 5.0 || 15.0 || 2.2 || 2.9
|-
! scope="row" style="text-align:center" | 2003
|style="text-align:center;"|
| 3 || 23 || 29 || 15 || 268 || 150 || 418 || 52 || 74 || 1.3 || 0.7 || 11.7 || 6.5 || 18.2 || 2.3 || 3.2
|- style="background-color: #EAEAEA"
! scope="row" style="text-align:center" | 2004
|style="text-align:center;"|
| 3 || 23 || 24 || 15 || 330 || 171 || 501 || 51 || 89 || 1.0 || 0.7 || 14.3 || 7.4 || 21.8 || 2.2 || 3.9
|-
! scope="row" style="text-align:center" | 2005
|style="text-align:center;"|
| 3 || 24 || 15 || 24 || 336 || 200 || 536 || 77 || 79 || 0.6 || 1.0 || 14.0 || 8.3 || 22.3 || 3.2 || 3.3
|- style="background-color: #EAEAEA"
! scope="row" style="text-align:center" | 2006
|style="text-align:center;"|
| 3 || 23 || 29 || 20 || 332 || 263 || 595 || 61 || 112 || 1.3 || 0.9 || 14.4 || 11.4 || 25.9 || 2.7 || 4.9
|-
! scope="row" style="text-align:center" | 2007
|style="text-align:center;"|
| 3 || 19 || 20 || 14 || 240 || 197 || 437 || 37 || 60 || 1.1 || 0.7 || 12.6 || 10.4 || 23.0 || 1.9 || 3.2
|- style="background-color: #EAEAEA"
! scope="row" style="text-align:center" | 2008
|style="text-align:center;"|
| 5 || 21 || 15 || 9 || 250 || 258 || 508 || 41 || 81 || 0.7 || 0.4 || 11.9 || 12.3 || 24.2 || 2.0 || 3.9
|-
! scope="row" style="text-align:center" | 2009
|style="text-align:center;"|
| 5 || 23 || 12 || 19 || 319 || 290 || 609 || 54 || 102 || 0.5 || 0.8 || 13.9 || 12.6 || 26.5 || 2.3 || 4.4
|- style="background-color: #EAEAEA"
! scope="row" style="text-align:center" | 2010
|style="text-align:center;"|
| 5 || 20 || 14 || 11 || 291 || 248 || 539 || 61 || 105 || 0.7 || 0.6 || 14.6 || 12.4 || 27.0 || 3.1 || 5.3
|-
! scope="row" style="text-align:center" | 2011
|style="text-align:center;"|
| 5 || 24 || 14 || 16 || 301 || 332 || 633 || 69 || 148 || 0.6 || 0.7 || 12.5 || 13.8 || 26.4 || 2.9 || 6.2
|- style="background-color: #EAEAEA"
! scope="row" style="text-align:center" | 2012
|style="text-align:center;"|
| 5 || 17 || 13 || 9 || 209 || 217 || 426 || 55 || 62 || 0.8 || 0.5 || 12.3 || 12.8 || 25.1 || 3.2 || 3.6
|-
! scope="row" style="text-align:center" | 2013
|style="text-align:center;"|
| 5 || 20 || 11 || 12 || 236 || 217 || 453 || 48 || 68 || 0.6 || 0.6 || 11.8 || 10.9 || 22.7 || 2.4 || 3.4
|- style="background-color: #EAEAEA"
! scope="row" style="text-align:center" | 2014
|style="text-align:center;"|
| 5 || 12 || 7 || 4 || 141 || 105 || 246 || 44 || 41 || 0.6 || 0.3 || 11.8 || 8.8 || 20.5 || 3.7 || 3.4
|-
! scope="row" style="text-align:center" | 2015
|style="text-align:center;"|
| 5 || 8 || 4 || 2 || 76 || 72 || 148 || 20 || 21 || 0.5 || 0.3 || 9.5 || 9.0 || 18.5 || 2.5 || 2.6
|- class="sortbottom"
! colspan=3| Career
! 279
! 228
! 182
! 3551
! 2829
! 6380
! 718
! 1105
! 0.8
! 0.7
! 12.7
! 10.1
! 22.9
! 2.6
! 4.0
|}

Honours and achievements

Team
AFL Premiership (West Coast): 2006 (C)
McClelland Trophy (West Coast): 2006 (C)
Individual
Brownlow Medal: 2004, 2010
Leigh Matthews Trophy (AFLPA MVP Award): 2006, 2011
All-Australian: 2004, 2006, 2008 (C), 2009 (VC), 2010, 2011 (VC)
Norm Smith Medal: 2005
Victorian Representative Honours in AFL Hall of Fame Tribute Match: 2008
Australian Representative Honours in International rules football: 2002
AFLPA Best Captain Award: 2011
AFLPA Best First Year Player Award: 2002
Carlton
John Nicholls Medal: 2008, 2009, 2010
Carlton F.C. Captain: 2008–2012
West Coast
West Coast Club Champion Award: 2004, 2006
Ross Glendinning Medal: 2005 (round 3), 2005 (round 20), 2006 (round 6)
West Coast Eagles Captain: 2006–2007
Other achievements
Goal of the Year: 2005
The Age Player of the Year: 2009

In 2022, he was inducted into Sport Australia Hall of Fame.

Media appearances
Towards the end of 2003, Judd began writing a column on the West Coast Eagles official website called "Juddy's Jibe". Some of his opinions presented in these columns prompted extensive media commentary, such as his view that footballers should not be role models. Throughout the 2006 season, the column was also published in Melbourne newspaper The Age, in which Judd wrote about issues such as global warming, terrorism, superficiality in the mass media, world peace and James Surowiecki's book The Wisdom of Crowds.

In 2009, Judd was featured in the official advertisement for the AFL, receiving a mark from Aaron Davey on a basketball court and then sprinting in front of a stampede of horses on a horse racing track before handballing to Adam Goodes.

After doing some guest commentary in 2016, in November 2016 Judd joined radio station Triple M in a special comments role.

In 2019, Judd alongside Rich Lister Josh Liberman and other investors backed up Thinkmarkets, a London-based online brokerage company in its pre-IPO raising.

Personal life
Judd is currently studying for a Master of Business Administration degree and has previously completed university courses in media studies and corporate governance. He owned a Toyota Prius hybrid car and switched to "green power" at his former Perth house. He is currently an environmental ambassador for Visy

On 31 December 2010, Judd married speech pathologist and model Rebecca Twigley. They have a son, Oscar (born July 2011), a daughter, Billie (born February 2014), and twin boys, Tom and Darcy (born September 2016). On the night of Judd's 2004 Brownlow win, Twigley wore a revealing red dress which caused national comment.

See also
 List of Caulfield Grammar School people

References

External links 

Chris Judd's profile in The Blueseum

Australian rules footballers from Melbourne
West Coast Eagles players
West Coast Eagles Premiership players
Carlton Football Club players
Sandringham Dragons players
East Perth Football Club players
Preston Football Club (VFA) players
Norm Smith Medal winners
Brownlow Medal winners
Leigh Matthews Trophy winners
All-Australians (AFL)
John Worsfold Medal winners
John Nicholls Medal winners
People educated at Caulfield Grammar School
Australian Institute of Sport Australian rules footballers
1983 births
Living people
Australia international rules football team players
West Australian Football Hall of Fame inductees
One-time VFL/AFL Premiership players
AFL Academy graduates
Sport Australia Hall of Fame inductees